Goran "Goca" Jurić (born 5 February 1963) is a Croatian former professional footballer who played as a defender.

During his career, he played for Velež Mostar, Red Star Belgrade, Celta Vigo, Croatia Zagreb, Yokohama F. Marinos, and NK Zagreb. He earned 4 caps for the Yugoslavia national football team in 1988, and 16 caps for the Croatia national football team.

International career
He made his debut for Yugoslavia in a September 1988 friendly match away against Spain. After the break-up of the country, he started to represent Croatia, playing his first game for them in April 1997.  He was a non-playing member of the squad for the 1998 FIFA World Cup, where Croatia finished third. His final international was an October 1999 European Championship qualification match against Serbia and Montenegro.

Career statistics

Club

International
Source:

Honours

Club
Velež Mostar
Yugoslav Cup: 1985–86

Red Star Belgrade
Yugoslav First League: 1987–88, 1989–90, 1990–91
Yugoslav Cup: 1989–90
European Cup: 1990-91

Celta de Vigo
Segunda División: 1991–92

Dinamo Zagreb
Croatian First League: 1996–97, 1997–98, 1998–99, 1999–2000
Croatian Cup: 1996–97, 1997–98

Individual
Croatia
FIFA World Cup Third place: 1998

Orders
 Order of the Croatian Interlace - 1998

References

External links

Goran Jurić profile at Reprezentacija.rs 

1963 births
Living people
Sportspeople from Mostar
Croats of Bosnia and Herzegovina
Bosnia and Herzegovina emigrants to Croatia
Association football defenders
Yugoslav footballers
Yugoslavia international footballers
Croatian footballers
Croatia international footballers
Dual internationalists (football)
1998 FIFA World Cup players
FK Velež Mostar players
Red Star Belgrade footballers
RC Celta de Vigo players
GNK Dinamo Zagreb players
NK Hrvatski Dragovoljac players
NK Zagreb players
Yokohama F. Marinos players
Yugoslav First League players
La Liga players
Croatian Football League players
J1 League players
Croatian expatriate footballers
Expatriate footballers in Spain
Croatian expatriate sportspeople in Spain
Expatriate footballers in Japan
Croatian expatriate sportspeople in Japan